Insects, which are a type of arthropod, are the most numerous group of multicellular organisms on the planet, with over a million species identified so far.

The longest insects are the stick insects, see below.

Representatives of the extinct dragonfly-like order Meganisoptera (also known as griffinflies) such as the Carboniferous Meganeura monyi and the Permian Meganeuropsis permiana are the largest insect species ever known. Their maximum body mass is uncertain, with estimates varying between 34 g and 240 g.

Dragonflies and damselflies (Odonata)
 See also the extinct genera Meganeuropsis and Meganeura, although they are not certain to be included in the modern dragonfly order.

Mayflies (Ephemeroptera)
The largest mayflies are members of the genus Proboscidoplocia from Madagascar.

Palaeodictyoptera (extinct)

The largest insect of the Palaeodictyoptera order, Mazothairos enormis from the Carboniferous period reached a wingspan of about 56 centimeters (22 in).

Grasshoppers, crickets, and relatives (Orthoptera)

The largest Saga and Pseudophyllus bush crickets are only a few centimeters smaller.

Titanopterans (Titanoptera) (extinct)
Related to modern orthopterans, Triassic insects of the extinct suborder of Titanoptera surpassed them in size. The wingspan of Gigatitan vulgaris was as large as of 40 centimetres (16 in). Clatrotitan andersoni also reached a huge size, having a forewing of 13.8 centimetres (5.4 in) long.

Earwigs (Dermaptera)
There are no recent records of this species and it is generally considered extinct.

Scorpionflies (Mecoptera)

Alderflies and allies (Megaloptera) 
This relatively small insect order includes some rather large species, many of which are noticeable for their elongated, imposing mandibles.

Stick insects (Phasmatodea)

The longest known stick insects are also the longest known insects, notably species in the tribe Pharnaciini, but they are generally relatively lightweight because of their slender shape. Another extremely long stick insect is Pharnacia maxima, which measured  with its legs extended.

Cockroaches and termites (Blattodea)

Termites
The largest of the termites is the African species Macrotermes bellicosus.

Praying mantises (Mantodea)
Some larger species have been known to capture and consume frogs, lizards, mice, small birds, small fish and even small snakes. The giant stick mantises Toxodera maxima and Ischnomantis gigas can reach lengths of over 17 cm, but are more gracile in build than other large mantises. Other species of (Toxodera and Ischnomantis) and other genera of stick mantises (Heterochaeta, Solygia and  Tauromantis) can attain lengths almost as large (over 16cm).

True bugs (Hemiptera)

The largest species of this diverse, huge order are the giant water bugs Lethocerus grandis and L. maximus. The cicadas of the genus Tacua can also grow to comparably large sizes.

Dobsonflies and relatives (Megaloptera)
Megaloptera includes dobsonflies, alderflies and relatives.

Net-winged insects (Neuroptera)
Some forms of this ancient order could grow extremely large during the Jurassic period and may have ranked among the largest insects ever.

Lice (Phthiraptera)
These parasitic insects are typically modest in size. The largest known species is the hog louse, Haematopinus suis, a sucking louse that lives on large livestock like pigs and cattle.

Stoneflies (Plecoptera) 

The largest species of stonefly is Pteronarcys californica of western North America, a species favored by fishermen as lures.

Beetles (Coleoptera)

Beetles constitute the most diverse order of organisms on earth, with about 400,000 species identified to this day. The most massive of them belong to the genera Goliathus, Megasoma, Chalcosoma, Titanus, Macrodontia, and Xixuthrus. The longest is the Hercules beetle, Dynastes hercules, with a maximum overall length of at least  including the very long pronotal horn.

Icebugs (Grylloblattodea)
They are a uniform honey-yellow in colour and covered with very short hair. Unlike some other species of grylloblatid, G. campodeiformis has eyes which have roughly 70 facets. The head is fairly flat and rounded. The thorax is elongate and over a third of the body length. The abdomen is composed of 10 segments and over half the body length. The legs are long and narrow (cursorial) with stout coxae and long femora. Their antennae are long ~ and thread-like. In adults, the number of antennal subsegments is variable, ranging from 24 to 27.

Ants, bees, and wasps (Hymenoptera)

The giant scoliid wasp Megascolia procer may rival the tarantula hawks in weight, if not length and wingspan. The largest known social wasps are queens of the Asian giant hornet (Vespa mandarinia), which can reach a body length exceeding 5 cm long with a  wingspan.

Butterflies and moths (Lepidoptera)

The largest lepidopteran species overall is often claimed to be either the Queen Alexandra's birdwing (Ornithoptera alexandrae), a butterfly from Papua New Guinea, or the Atlas moth (Attacus atlas), a moth from Southeast Asia. One Atlas moth allegedly had a wingspan of  but this measurement was not verified.

True flies (Diptera)

The largest species of crane fly (which are much thinner than Gauromydas) is Holorusia brobdignagius. It can attain about the same head-and-body length and wingspan, but if the legs are extended in front of and behind the body, then an overall length of  makes it the longest true fly.

Booklice (Psocoptera)

Fleas (Siphonaptera)
The largest species of flea is Hystrichopsylla schefferi.

Thrips (Thysanoptera)
Members of the genus Phasmothrips are the largest thrips.

Caddisflies (Trichoptera)
The largest of the small, moth-like caddisflies is Eubasilissa maclachlani.

Silverfishes and allies (Thysanura)

Angel insects (Zoraptera)

References 

Largest insects
Insects
Insects